Jai Jawan  Jai Kisan ("") was a slogan of Lal Bahadur Shastri,the second Prime Minister of India spoken in 1965 at a public gathering Uruwa, Prayagraj.

Soon after Shastri took over the prime ministership of India after Nehru's death, India was attacked by Pakistan. At the same time, there was a scarcity of food grains in the country. Shastri gave the slogan Jai Jawan Jai Kisan to enthuse the soldiers to defend India and simultaneously cheering farmers to do their best to increase the production of food grains to reduce dependence on imports. It became a very popular slogan.

The I&B Ministry commemorated Shastri on his 48th martyr's day:

Variants 
Jai Jawaan, Jai Kisaan, Jai Vigyan  (by Atal Bihari Vajpayee, Prime Minister)
After the Pokhran tests in 1998, Atal Bihari Vajpayee added Jai Vigyan (Hail Science) to the slogan to underline the importance of knowledge in India's progress.

Jai Jawaan, Jai Kisaan, Jai Vigyan, Jai Anusandhan  (by Narendra Modi, Prime Minister)
PM Modi speaking on "Future India: Science and Technology" at the 106th Indian Science Congress at Lovely Professional University, Jalandhar, added Jai Anusandhan "hail the research" to the famous slogan of Jai Jawan, Jai Kisan and Atal Bihari Vajpayee's Jai Vigyan to emphasize the importance of research work for the national development.

Jai Jawaan, Jai Kisaan, Jai Vigyan, Jai Vidwan ( by Dr. K C Mishra, Director, LBSIM New Delhi)
During the acceptance speech of Sunil Bharti Mittal delivered at Teen Murti Bhavan on 15 December 2009 after receiving the 10th Lal Bahadur Shastri National Award from the President of India, the Director of the Lal Bahadur Shastri Institute of Management, Delhi, Dr. Kailash Chandra Mishra. Jai Vidwan means "hail the learned"

Na Jawan Na Kisan
With reference to the 2021 Union Budget and the original quote by Shashtri, Shashi Tharoor used the phrase "Na Jawan na Kisan" (which literally translates to "No soldier no farmer") in the parliament.

In popular culture
In 2015, a film based on Shastri's life was released which was named after this slogan.

See also
Jai Jawan Jai Kisan Mazdoor Congress
Jai Jawan, 1970 Indian film
Jai Jawan Jai Makan, 1971 Indian film

References 

Indian political slogans
Shastri administration
1965 in India
Hindi words and phrases